Jerry Cooke may refer to:

 Jerry Cooke (mountaineer)
 Jerry Cooke (photographer)